Henrik Olov August Hjelt (born 6 March 1968, on Lidingö), is a Swedish comedian and actor. He is also a reserve officer in the Swedish Amphibious Corps and a lawyer.

Selected filmography 
1999-:Parlamentet (The Parliament)
2001: Känd från TV (Known From TV)
2002: Klassfesten (The Class Reunion)
2002: Utanför din dörr (Right Outside Your Door)
2004: Treasure Planet (Swedish voice for B.E.N.)
2005: Robots (Swedish voice for Crank)
2007: Playa del Sol (TV-series)

References

1968 births
Swedish male actors
Swedish comedians
Living people